Santa Cruz Barillas (also known as  in Qʼanjobʼal) is a town, with a population of 17,166 (2018 census), and a municipality in the Guatemalan department of Huehuetenango. It is situated at 1450 metres above sea level. It covers a terrain of 1,174 km². The annual festival is April 29-May 4.

Climate
Barillas has a tropical rainforest climate (Af) with heavy to very heavy rainfall year-round and extremely heavy rainfall from June to August.

References

External links
Muni in Spanish
Website of Santa Cruz Barillas

Municipalities of the Huehuetenango Department